Boris Borisovich Kokorev (20 April 1959 in Tbilisi – 22 October 2018 in Moscow) was a Russian competitive pistol shooter who won a gold medal in the Men's 50 Metre event at the 1996 Summer Olympics in Atlanta.

References

External links
 
 

1959 births
2018 deaths
Soviet male sport shooters
Russian male sport shooters
ISSF pistol shooters
Olympic shooters of the Soviet Union
Olympic shooters of the Unified Team
Olympic shooters of Russia
Shooters at the 1988 Summer Olympics
Shooters at the 1992 Summer Olympics
Shooters at the 1996 Summer Olympics
Shooters at the 2000 Summer Olympics
Shooters at the 2004 Summer Olympics
Olympic gold medalists for Russia
Sportspeople from Tbilisi
Olympic medalists in shooting
Medalists at the 1996 Summer Olympics